Sibghatullah Mojaddedi (27 September 1926 – 11 February 2019) was an Afghan politician, who served as Acting President after the fall of Mohammad Najibullah's government in April 1992. He was the first leader to call for armed resistance against the Soviet-backed regime in 1979 and founded the Afghan National Liberation Front at the time; later becoming a respected figure among the various Afghan mujahideen. He served as the chairman of the 2003 loya jirga that approved Afghanistan's new constitution. In 2005, he was appointed chairman of the Meshrano Jirga, upper house of the National Assembly of Afghanistan, and was reappointed as a member in 2011. He also served on the Afghan High Peace Council. Mojaddedi is considered to have been a moderate Muslim leader.

Early years 
Mojaddedi was born on 27 September 1926 in Kabul, Afghanistan. His family, the Mojaddedis, are a well-known family of religious scholars from Kabul who trace their ancestry to Mujaddid Ahmad Sirhindi, a prominent 16th-century Islamic scholar and Naqshbandi Sufi. Ethnically, the Mojaddedis are categorized as Arab.

Mojaddedi studied Islamic Law and Jurisprudence at al-Azhar University in Cairo, Egypt. In 1952 he returned to Afghanistan to teach in high schools and at Kabul University, where he became known as an advocate of Afghan independence. In 1959 Mojaddedi was accused of conspiring against then Soviet Prime Minister Nikita Khrushchev and was imprisoned without trial until 1964. It is believed his leftist brother, Rahmatullah Mojaddedi, passed information to Babrak Karmal and in turn to the Daoud government that Sibghatullah planned to blow up a bridge in Kabul targeting the Soviet delegation's motorcade in a visit. After release, he was forced into exile for his outspoken comments regarding Soviet influence in Afghanistan. His period in exile was spent in several countries such as Denmark and Pakistan before his entry into Afghan politics.

Afghan resistance
Following the Saur Revolution in 1978, the new communist Khalq government killed Mojaddedi's brother and several of his relatives. During exile in Peshawar, Mojaddedi founded the Jebh-e-Nejat-e Melli (National Liberation Front) group. He was the first person to call for a nationwide jihad against the Democratic Republic of Afghanistan, on March 13, 1979. Throughout the Soviet-Afghan War he made many contributions for the Afghan mujahideen cause. His militia was most prominent in Kunar Province.

Mojaddedi's vision was an Islamic republic, possibly with a restored monarchy. He was opposed to Islamic fundamentalism and harbored friendly feelings towards the West.

In 1988, he was elected head of the Afghan Interim Government, based in Peshawar.

Presidency (1992) 

In April 1992, he was elected the chair of the Islamic Jihad Council that was set up to establish a post-Soviet Afghan government. He entered Kabul on 28 April amid a large crowd and assumed the new Islamic republic, and offered a general amnesty to all Afghans except the deposed President, Mohammad Najibullah, whose fate would be decided by "the public". His election was supported by all mujahideen guerilla factions except the Hezb-e Islami Gulbuddin, whose forces started firing rockets at the capital; violent clashes took place between them and soldiers of the new coalition near the Interior Ministry building. Mojadeddi pleaded with Gulbuddin Hekmatyar to lay down their arms, and commented "Mr. Hekmatyar was our brother. We were not expecting such an action. It is not allowed to him according to religion, according to Afghan tradition, to do this."

During the period that Mojaddedi was President of Afghanistan, the Ariana plane carrying him to Kabul was hit by an RPG as it was landing at Kabul International Airport. The plane landed safely, with no fatalities.

This position lasted for three months, although some sources say that he stayed in power for only two months. In May 1992, Burhanuddin Rabbani established a new leadership council, which undermined Mojaddedi's leadership, resulting in his resignation and handing over power to a new council.

Later political career 
After the fall of the Taliban in 2001, Mojaddedi returned to Afghanistan from Pakistan and became chairman of the 2003 loya jirga, the assembly which approved Afghanistan's new constitution. He caused controversy there by publicly calling Malalai Joya a "communist" and "infidel" after her speech, for which he later apologized. Amnesty International said that Mojaddedi and the jirga's leadership curtrailed freedom of speech at the assembly, including refusing to launch a vote on changing "Islamic Republic of Afghanistan" to "Republic of Afghanistan" despite getting enough signatures, publicly calling the delegates who signed it "unbelievers" and "apostates".

In 2005 he became chairman of the Meshrano Jirga, Afghanistan's upper house of the National Assembly of Afghanistan, and he was reappointed as member in 2011. He also served on the Afghan High Peace Council.

On 26 August 2015, Mojaddedi launched a new political coalition, the Council of Jihad and National Political Parties.

Later life and death 
Two suicide bombers carried out an attack in Kabul on 12 March 2006 against Mojaddedi, while he was a member of the upper house and head of a reconciliation committee aimed at engaging former Taliban members. The attackers blew up a vehicle filled with explosives next to his car as he was being driven through the streets. Four pedestrians were killed and Mojaddedi was slightly injured, with burns to his face and hands.

Mojaddedi was erroneously reported to have died on 9 February 2016. He was subsequently reported to have been present at a ceremony commemorating the 27th anniversary of the Soviet withdrawal from Afghanistan on 15 February 2016. It was reported on 12 February 2019 that Mojaddedi had died. He was 93.

References

Bibliography

External links

 Biography of Sibghatullah Mojaddedi
 Afghanistan National Independent Peace and Reconciliation Commission

1926 births
2019 deaths
20th-century heads of state of Afghanistan
21st-century Afghan politicians
Presidents of Afghanistan
Presidents of the House of Elders (Afghanistan)
Afghan anti-communists
Afghan Sunni Muslims
Afghan Sufis
Al-Azhar University alumni
Academic staff of Kabul University
Pashtun people
Afghan expatriates in Pakistan
1990s in Afghanistan